Jamie Mason is an American author.

Her most recent book, The Hidden Things, was inspired by seeing a clip of a girl on the internet, as mentioned in the LA Review of Books. The story concerns a fictional hunt for one of the masterpieces stolen in the Isabella Stewart Gardner Museum theft.

Novels

Reviews
Jamie’s books have been well received including reviews in the New York Times. The Guardian said, “In Three Graves Full, Mason places her characters on a tightrope overlooking a feverish mixture of farce, emotion and thrillerish violence. You can never be sure which way they're going to fall.”

The NY Journal of Books said, “Three Graves Full is an extraordinary debut novel that ensnares the reader in its web of suspense and ratchets up the anxiety with each chapter.” Publisher's Marketplace said about The Hidden Things, "Those with an interest in the real-life museum theft may want to check this one out." The Washington Review of Books said, "Mason combines taut action with an intense character study and hauntingly memorable prose."

Author Tana French said, "Hidden Things is a treat: a heist story taken to pieces and expertly put back together at off-kilter angles into a startling, smart, vivid book."

References

External links
 
 Simon & Schuster author page

21st-century American novelists
21st-century American women writers
American crime fiction writers
American women novelists
American mystery novelists
Living people
Writers from Oklahoma
Year of birth missing (living people)